Rutherford Technology High School (abbreviated as RTHS), also known as Rutherford High School, is a government-funded co-educational comprehensive secondary day school, located in Rutherford, a suburb of the city of Maitland in the Hunter Region of New South Wales, Australia.

Established in 1985, the school enrolled approximately 1,222 students in 2020, from Year 7 to Year 12, of whom 20 percent identified as Indigenous Australians and five percent were from a language background other than English. The school is operated by the NSW Department of Education; the principal is Simone Hughes (updated 2020).

Overview 
Rutherford High has an extensive agriculture facility, sporting facilities and a specialised music "laboratory". It underwent extensive renovations throughout the entire school in 2018.

Rutherford High was built in 1985, at the same time and right behind its companion school, Rutherford Public. The two compete in sport programs together, use each other's facilities and both wear maroon, with a maroon fence surrounding both schools. Recently, Maitland Tutorial Centre, which was located on South Street, Telarah (South Street Public School), has relocated to a new location between the two schools. Rutherford High has also been extended as far up to the Tutorial Centre, as part of the ongoing renovations, with a renovated front office, shelter, science labs, asphalt area, hall and a new two-story classroom building that will be joined onto the old two-story building, with an elevator for students and staff in wheelchairs to get upstairs with easy access.

See also 

 List of government schools in New South Wales
 Education in Australia

References

External links

NSW Schools website

Educational institutions established in 1985
1985 establishments in Australia
Maitland, New South Wales
Public high schools in New South Wales